Drogosław - is a Polish coat of arms. It was used by several szlachta families in the times of the Polish–Lithuanian Commonwealth.

History

This shield was brought to Poland from Silesia. This took place in the year 1333, during the reign of King Kazimierz the Great. The occasion on which these arms were granted to an ancestor of the house was as follows: 
The enemy had encircled the army and enclosed it in a ring, when this ancestor, gathering his courage, used his sword to open a path and broke through the circle. A Drogoslaw is the first we know of with these arms, and they took their name from him.

Blazon
Gules, upon a demi annulet an arrow in pale, point to chief both Argent. Out of a crest coronet, a panache of five ostrich plumes proper.

Notable bearers
Notable bearers of this coat of arms include:

Władysław herbu Drogosław Truszkowski (Lemberg/Lwów, 3 May 1876 - Gaza, 26 March 1917), captain (Hauptmann) and chief commander of the Austro-Hungarian artillery troops in the Palestine front in the First World War. He died a heroic death at the First Battle of Gaza, and was buried in the crypt of the Assumptionist fathers in Jerusalem.

See also
 Polish heraldry
 Heraldry
 Coat of Arms

Polish coats of arms